The women's javelin throw event at the 2011 All-Africa Games was held on 13 September.

Results

References
Results
Results

Javelin
2011 in women's athletics